Richard Dixon (born 23 February 1990) is a Jamaican footballer who plays as a defender for Chattanooga FC in the National Independent Soccer Association.

Career
Dixon played for Hanover u15 and Also represent Ruseas high school in the Dacosta cup in Jamaica.

College and amateur
Dixon played four years of college soccer at the University of West Florida.

During his time at college, Dixon also played for USL PDL clubs Mississippi Brilla in 2010 and 2011 and Panama City Beach Pirates in 2012.

Professional
Dixon signed his first professional contract in 2013, signing for new USL Pro franchise VSI Tampa Bay FC. After Tampa Bay folded at the end of their debut season, Dixon signed with USL Pro team Charlotte Eagles.

On 15 January 2015, it was announced that Dixon signed with USL expansion side Saint Louis FC. While with the club that year, he was slated to join the Jamaica national team for the Copa América and Gold Cup tournaments that summer, but was ultimately not named to the final tournament roster for either competition after suffering an injury during a U.S. Open Cup match against Minnesota United FC.

Dixon was released by Saint Louis FC on 10 November 2016.

In January 2020, Dixon was announced as the first-ever professional player signing by Chattanooga FC.

References

External links 
 

1990 births
Living people
Jamaican footballers
Jamaican expatriate footballers
Mississippi Brilla players
Panama City Beach Pirates players
VSI Tampa Bay FC players
Charlotte Eagles players
Saint Louis FC players
OKC Energy FC players
Chattanooga Red Wolves SC players
Expatriate soccer players in the United States
USL League Two players
USL Championship players
Association football defenders
USL League One players
West Florida Argonauts men's soccer players
Jamaican expatriate sportspeople in the United States
Chattanooga FC players
People from Hanover Parish